Mukah is a district, in Mukah Division, Sarawak, Malaysia.

References